Burlorne Tregoose (meaning woodland farm of the happy dwelling) is a hamlet in the parish of St Breock, Cornwall, England, UK.

References

Hamlets in Cornwall